Mount Thompson is a  mountain summit located four kilometres west of Bow Lake in Banff National Park, in the Canadian Rockies of Alberta, Canada. Its nearest higher peak is Mount Baker,  to the west. Mount Thompson is situated east of the Wapta Icefield, and is a member of the Waputik Mountains. Mount Thompson can be seen from the Icefields Parkway at Bow Lake.


History
Mount Thompson is named for Charles Sproull Thompson (1869–1921) who participated in numerous first ascents in the Canadian Rockies. In August 1897, Charles Thompson, Hugh Stutfield, and J. Norman Collie camped on the shores of Bow Lake; then proceeded to climb the Bow Glacier, which at that time descended farther down into the valley; then crossed the Wapta Icefield to attain the summit of Mount Gordon. From Mount Gordon they were surrounded by unnamed mountains and named one of them Mount Thompson. The first ascent of Mount Thompson was made the following year (1898), by Norman Collie, Hugh Stutfield, and Herman Woolley. The mountain's name became official in 1928 by the Geographical Names Board of Canada. Charles Thompson named Portal Peak which is a subsidiary peak located 1.5 km southeast of his peak. Portal Peak flanks one side of Bow Glacier, which in 1897 was considered the portal to the Wapta Icefield.

Geology
Mount Thompson is an overthrust peak situated between the Bow Glacier and Peyto Glacier. Like other mountains in Banff Park, Mount Thompson is composed of sedimentary rock laid down during the Precambrian to Jurassic periods. Formed in shallow seas, this sedimentary rock was pushed east and over the top of younger rock during the Laramide orogeny.

Climate
Based on the Köppen climate classification, Mount Thompson is located in a subarctic climate zone with cold, snowy winters, and mild summers.

See also

List of mountains of Canada
Geography of Alberta

References

External links
 Parks Canada web site: Banff National Park

Three-thousanders of Alberta
Mountains of Banff National Park
Canadian Rockies
Alberta's Rockies